Roll Tide (or Roll Tide Roll) is the rallying cry for the Alabama Crimson Tide athletic teams.  The trademark to the phrase is claimed by the University of Alabama, with licensing and marketing by The Collegiate Licensing Company.

In popular culture

Music
 "Roll Tide" is the name of a dramatic piece of orchestral music that was composed by Hans Zimmer for the 1995 Hollywood Pictures film Crimson Tide. Most of the film is set aboard the USS Alabama, an  nuclear-powered fleet ballistic missile submarine.
 "Roll Tide" is the name of a song by the California based American folk-rock band Dawes on their studio album We're All Gonna Die, released in September 2016.  The song is a melancholy lamentation about love, forgiveness, and reconciliation; it alludes to the Alabama Crimson Tide rallying cry and to the state of Alabama itself, but it also draws upon a more literal, water-based metaphor relating to the word "tide".

References

External links 
 2010 ESPN Roll Tide Commercial

Alabama Crimson Tide
Southeastern Conference fight songs
1995 songs
Film scores